The x86 instruction set refers to the set of instructions that x86-compatible microprocessors support. The instructions are usually part of an executable program, often stored as a computer file and executed on the processor.

The x86 instruction set has been extended several times, introducing wider registers and datatypes as well as new functionality.

x86 integer instructions 

Below is the full 8086/8088 instruction set of Intel (81 instructions total). Most if not all of these instructions are available in 32-bit mode; they just operate on 32-bit registers (eax, ebx, etc.) and values instead of their 16-bit (ax, bx, etc.) counterparts. The updated instruction set is also grouped according to architecture (i386, i486, i686) and more generally is referred to as (32-bit) x86 and (64-bit) x86-64 (also known as AMD64).

Original 8086/8088 instructions

Added in specific processors

Added with 80186/80188

Added with 80286

Added with 80386 

Added with 80486

Added in P5/P6-class processors 
Integer/system instructions that were not present in the basic 80486 instruction set, but were added in processors prior to the introduction of SSE. (Discontinued instructions are not included.)

Added as instruction set extensions

Added with x86-64 

These instructions can only be encoded in 64 bit mode.  They fall in four groups:

 original instructions that reuse existing opcodes for a different purpose (MOVSXD replacing ARPL)
 original instructions with new opcodes (SWAPGS)
 existing instructions extended to a 64 bit address size (JRCXZ)
 existing instructions extended to a 64 bit operand size (remaining instructions)

Most instructions with a 64 bit operand size encode this using a REX.W prefix; in the absence of the REX.W prefix,
the corresponding instruction with 32 bit operand size is encoded.  This mechanism also applies to most other instructions with 32 bit operand
size.  These are not listed here as they do not gain a new mnemonic in Intel syntax when used with a 64 bit operand size.

Bit manipulation extensions 

Bit manipulation instructions. For all of the VEX-encoded instructions defined by BMI1 and BMI2, the operand size may be 32 or 64 bits, controlled by the VEX.W bit - none of these instructions are available in 16-bit variants.

Added with Intel TSX

Added with Intel CET 
Intel CET (Control-Flow Enforcement Technology) adds two distinct features to help protect against security exploits such as return-oriented programming: a shadow stack (CET_SS), and indirect branch tracking (CET_IBT).

Added with other cross-vendor extensions

Added with other Intel-specific extensions

Added with other AMD-specific extensions

x87 floating-point instructions 

The x87 coprocessor, if present, provides support for floating-point arithmetic. The coprocessor provides eight data registers, each holding one 80-bit floating-point value (1 sign bit, 15 exponent bits, 64 mantissa bits) - these registers are organized as a stack, with the top-of-stack register referred to as "st" or "st(0)", and the other registers referred to as st(1),st(2),...st(7). It additionally provides a number of control and status registers, including "PC" (precision control, to control whether floating-point operations should be rounded to 24, 53 or 64 mantissa bits) and "RC" (rounding control, to pick rounding-mode: round-to-zero, round-to-positive-infinity, round-to-negative-infinity, round-to-nearest-even) and a 4-bit condition code register "CC", whose four bits are individually referred to as C0,C1,C2 and C3). Not all of the arithmetic instructions provided by x87 obey PC and RC.

Original 8087 instructions

x87 instructions added in later processors

SIMD instructions

MMX instructions 

MMX instructions operate on the mm registers, which are 64 bits wide. They are shared with the FPU registers.

Original MMX instructions 
Added with Pentium MMX

MMX instructions added in specific processors

MMX instructions added with MMX+ and SSE 
The following MMX instruction were added with SSE. They are also available on the Athlon under the name MMX+.

MMX instructions added with SSE2 
The following MMX instructions were added with SSE2:

MMX instructions added with SSSE3

SSE instructions 

Added with Pentium III

SSE instructions operate on xmm registers, which are 128 bit wide.

SSE consists of the following SSE SIMD floating-point instructions:

 The floating point single bitwise operations ANDPS, ANDNPS, ORPS and XORPS produce the same result as the SSE2 integer (PAND, PANDN, POR, PXOR) and double ones (ANDPD, ANDNPD, ORPD, XORPD), but can introduce extra latency for domain changes when applied values of the wrong type.

SSE2 instructions 

Added with Pentium 4

SSE2 SIMD floating-point instructions

SSE2 data movement instructions

SSE2 packed arithmetic instructions

SSE2 logical instructions

SSE2 compare instructions

SSE2 shuffle and unpack instructions

SSE2 conversion instructions 

 CMPSD and MOVSD have the same name as the string instruction mnemonics CMPSD (CMPS) and MOVSD (MOVS); however, the former refer to scalar double-precision floating-points whereas the latters refer to doubleword strings.

SSE2 SIMD integer instructions

SSE2 MMX-like instructions extended to SSE registers 
SSE2 allows execution of MMX instructions on SSE registers, processing twice the amount of data at once.

SSE2 integer instructions for SSE registers only 
The following instructions can be used only on SSE registers, since by their nature they do not work on MMX registers

SSE3 instructions 

Added with Pentium 4 supporting SSE3

SSE3 SIMD floating-point instructions

SSE3 SIMD integer instructions

SSSE3 instructions 

Added with Xeon 5100 series and initial Core 2

The following MMX-like instructions extended to SSE registers were added with SSSE3

SSE4 instructions

SSE4.1 

Added with Core 2 manufactured in 45nm

SSE4.1 SIMD floating-point instructions

SSE4.1 SIMD integer instructions

SSE4a 

Added with Phenom processors

SSE4.2 

Added with Nehalem processors

F16C 
Half-precision floating-point conversion.

FMA3 
Supported in AMD processors starting with the Piledriver architecture and Intel starting with Haswell processors and Broadwell processors since 2014.

Fused multiply-add (floating-point vector multiply–accumulate) with three operands.

AVX 
AVX were first supported by Intel with Sandy Bridge and by AMD with Bulldozer.

Vector operations on 256 bit registers.

AVX2 
Introduced in Intel's Haswell microarchitecture and AMD's Excavator.

Expansion of most vector integer SSE and AVX instructions to 256 bits

AVX-512 

AVX-512, introduced in 2014, adds 512-bit wide vector registers (extending the 256-bit registers, which become the new registers' lower halves) and doubles their count to 32; the new registers are thus named zmm0 through zmm31. It adds eight mask registers, named k0 through k7, which may be used to restrict operations to specific parts of a vector register. Unlike previous instruction set extensions, AVX-512 is implemented in several groups; only the foundation ("AVX-512F") extension is mandatory.  Most of the added instructions may also be used with the 256- and 128-bit registers.

Cryptographic instructions

Intel AES instructions 

6 new instructions.

CLMUL instructions

RDRAND and RDSEED

Intel SHA instructions 

7 new instructions.

Intel AES Key Locker instructions 
These instructions, available in Tiger Lake and later Intel processors, are designed to enable encryption/decryption with an AES key without having access to any unencrypted copies of the key during the actual encryption/decryption process.

VIA PadLock instructions 

The VIA PadLock instructions are instructions designed to apply cryptographic primitives in bulk, similar to the 8086 repeated string instructions. As such, unless otherwise specified, they take, as applicable, pointers to source data in ES:rSI and destination data in ES:rDI, and a data-size or count in rCX. Like the old string instructions, they are all designed to be interruptible.

Other instructions 

x86 also includes discontinued instruction sets which are no longer supported by Intel and AMD, and undocumented instructions which execute but are not officially documented.

Virtualization instructions

AMD-V instructions

Intel VT-x instructions

Undocumented instructions

Undocumented x86 instructions 
The x86 CPUs contain undocumented instructions which are implemented on the chips but not listed in some official documents. They can be found in various sources across the Internet, such as Ralf Brown's Interrupt List and at sandpile.org

Some of these instructions are widely available across many/most x86 CPUs, while others are specific to a narrow range of CPUs.

Undocumented instructions that are widely available across many x86 CPUs include

Undocumented instructions that appear only in a limited subset of x86 CPUs include

Undocumented x87 instructions

See also 
 CLMUL
 RDRAND
 Larrabee extensions
 Advanced Vector Extensions 2
 Bit Manipulation Instruction Sets
 CPUID
 List of discontinued x86 instructions

References

External links 

 Free IA-32 and x86-64 documentation, provided by Intel
 x86 Opcode and Instruction Reference
 x86 and amd64 instruction reference
Instruction tables: Lists of instruction latencies, throughputs and micro-operation breakdowns for Intel, AMD and VIA CPUs
 Netwide Assembler Instruction List (from Netwide Assembler)

 
Instruction set listings